The Johnston's African dormouse (Graphiurus johnstoni) is a species of rodent in the family Gliridae. It is found in Malawi, Zambia, and Zimbabwe. Its natural habitat is moist savanna.

References
Holden, M. E.. 2005. Family Gliridae. pp. 819–841 in Mammal Species of the World a Taxonomic and Geographic Reference. D. E. Wilson and D. M. Reeder eds. Johns Hopkins University Press, Baltimore.
 Schlitter, D. 2004.  Graphiurus johnstoni.   2006 IUCN Red List of Threatened Species.   Downloaded on 29 July 2007.

Graphiurus
Mammals described in 1898
Taxonomy articles created by Polbot